The Foundation for Human Rights in Cuba (FHRC) is an American 501(c)3 non-profit organization established in 1992 to promote a "non-violent transition to a democratic Cuba" and works to empower independent civil society organizations within Cuba.

References

External links

Cuban democracy movements
Human rights organizations based in Cuba